The Isard Pistol is a semi-automatic pistol that fires the 9x23mm Largo from a Blowback operated system. It was designed and produced by the Comisión de Industrias de Guerra (CIG )  (War Industry Commission in English), by orders of the Generalitat of Catalonia during the Spanish Civil War, from 1937 to 1938.

History
The Isard pistol was designed by the CIG and some exiled Basque gunsmiths. It was ordered and approved by the Generalidad de Cataluña, and was put into production. Total production was approximately 300 units.

Design
Stylistically, the Isard's design resembled the M1911. However, the Colt M1911 incorporated a locked-breech design and used a .45 ACP round, whereas the Isard pistol was a blowback design and used a 9x23mm Largo round.

Two designs were made for the weapons. The first was made with a one part body of the gun (like almost every gun). The second model had several small changes.

See also
Labora Fontbernat M-1938
Pistol F. Ascaso

References

External links
 Catalonia's Attempt at a Pistol: the Blowback Isard

Semi-automatic pistols
 Spanish Civil War
9mm Largo firearms
Catalonia
Pistols